Topsportcentrum Rotterdam is an indoor arena located in Rotterdam next to the Feijenoord Stadion. The arena opened in 2000 and has a capacity of 2,500 seats. It holds many sports events in various sports and levels, such as international World and European Championships and Dutch National Championships.

The complex exists as two sporting halls. The first is located on the first floor and is 48x28 metres, while the pitch is 40x20 metres. On the second floor another sports hall of 44x24 metres is located. The pitch in this hall is 40x20 metres also, but the underground is rebound ace hardcourt.

As well as the sporting facilities, various hotel, restaurant and cafe facilities are available.

Teams
Currently there are three national sports teams that play their games inside the Topsportcentrum: the volleyball team Ortec Rotterdam Nesselande and the basketball teams Feyenoord Basketball.

Events

This is a list of events held in the Topsportcentrum Rotterdam.

Basketball
All Star Basketball Gala (2006)
Women's All Star Basketball Gala (2010,2011)
Dutch Cup Finals (2006)
FEB Basketball Gala (2005)
Harlem Globetrotters Exhibition (2004)
Men's International Basketball test matches (2002, 2003)
Wheelchair basketball European Cup (2000, 2001)
Women's European Basketball Championship Qualifiers (2005, 2006)
Women's International Basketball test matches (2005)

Fighting
Bep van Klaveren Memorial (2002, 2003, 2004, 2005, 2006)
Big Boss Boxing Gala (2004, 2005)
Dutch Boxing Championships (2000)
Fighting Gala (2001)
It's Showtime Trophy (2006)
Kickboxing Gala (2000, 2001, 2002, 2003, 2006)
Kickboxing Muay Thai Gala (2001)
Mix Fight Gala (2004)
Regilio Tuur homecoming (2001)
Sumo Challenge (2000)

Futsal
European Futsal Championships (2001)
Footlockers Futsal Tournament (2000)
International test matches The Netherlands (2005)

Handball
Mini CSIT Handball Tournament (2005)
Women's Holland Handball Tournament (former Lucardi Cup) (2000, 2001, 2002, 2003, 2004, 2005, 2006)
Women's European Handball Championship Qualifiers (2006)
Women's World Handball Championship Qualifiers (2001)

Indoor Hockey
European Indoor Hockey Championships A-Division (2001)
European Indoor Hockey Championships B-Division (2002)

Judo
Dutch Open Judo Championships (2003, 2004, 2005, 2006)
Dutch Judo Championships (2004, 2005)
European -12 Judo Championships (2002)
European -17 Judo Championships (2004)
Rotterdam Judo Grand Prix (2000, 2001, 2002)

Jujutsu
Jujutsu World Championships (2006)

Karate
Dutch Open Karate Championships (2001, 2002, 2003, 2004, 2005)
Dutch Senior Karate Championships (2005)
Golden League (2006)
Rotterdam Karate Cup (2004, 2005, 2006)
World Gojukai Karate Championships (2005)

Korfball
Dutch B-Youth Korfball Championship (2000)
Rotterdam Korfball Challenge (2000, 2001, 2002, 2003, 2004, 2005)
World Korfball Championships (2003)

Table tennis
European Table tennis Top 12 (2002)
Table tennis Pro Tour (2001)

Volleyball
Dutch Volleyball Cup Finals (2004)
Final Four (2006)
Men's European Volleyball Championship Qualifiers (2002, 2006)
Men's European Volleyball League (2006)
Men's youth Volleyball international test matches (2006)
Ortec Rotterdam Nesselande European Cup matches (2002, 2004, 2005, 2006)
Women's Volleyball international test matches (2006)
Men's European Volleyball Championship Qualifiers (2001)

Other
2006 Sky Radio Tennis Masters
Dutch Sportsman of the year announcement (2005)
European Aerobics and Fitness Championships (2004)
European Wushu Championship (2000)
Rotterdam Kendo Tournament (2000)
Kingdom of the Netherlands Games (2001)
Rotterdam Sportsman of the year announcement (2001, 2003, 2004)
Rotterdam Tennismasters (2002, 2003, 2004, 2005)
World 3-cushion Billiards Championships (2004)
Zomercarnaval Queen Election (2003)
Zuid-Holland Gymnastics Championships (2001, 2004, 2006)
Chess (Dutch Youth Chess Championships 2014)

See also
Topsportcentrum

References

External links

Indoor arenas in the Netherlands
Basketball venues in the Netherlands
Handball venues in the Netherlands
Volleyball venues in the Netherlands
Sports venues completed in 2000
2000 establishments in the Netherlands
Sports venues in Rotterdam
21st-century architecture in the Netherlands